The Villa St. Clara Apartments is a building complex located in southwest Portland, Oregon listed on the National Register of Historic Places.

See also
 National Register of Historic Places listings in Southwest Portland, Oregon

References

1911 establishments in Oregon
Renaissance Revival architecture in Oregon
Residential buildings completed in 1911
Apartment buildings on the National Register of Historic Places in Portland, Oregon
Southwest Portland, Oregon
Portland Historic Landmarks